Carl Henry Hanford (March 12, 1916 - August 14, 2011) was a United States Hall of Fame trainer of Thoroughbred racehorses best known for guiding Kelso to five straight American Horse of the Year titles; no other horse has won more than three times. 

Hanford's training career was interrupted when he served five years in the United States Army Remount Service during World War II.

Carl Hanford also notably trained La Corredora, a racemare voted the Champion Handicap Mare of 1953 by the New York Turf Writers Association. 

Ira Hanford was a brother of Carl who in 1936 became the first apprentice jockey to ever win the Kentucky Derby.

References

	
1916 births
2011 deaths
American horse trainers
United States Army personnel of World War II
United States Thoroughbred Racing Hall of Fame inductees
People from Fairbury, Nebraska
People from Wilmington, Delaware